Marianne Bauer was a West German luger who competed during the 1950s. At the inaugural FIL World Luge Championships in Oslo, Norway in 1955, she won the bronze medal in the women's singles event.

References

External links
Hickok sports information on World champions in luge and skeleton.

German female lugers
Possibly living people
Year of birth missing